The 1897 Chicago Colts season was the 26th season of the Chicago Colts franchise, the 22nd in the National League and the 5th at West Side Park. The Colts finished ninth in the National League with a record of 59–73.

While on the surface the season seemed to be uneventful, on June 29, the Colts beat the Louisville Colonels 36–7, the most runs ever scored by a team in a single game.

Regular season

Season standings

Record vs. opponents

Roster

Player stats

Batting

Starters by position 
Note: Pos = Position; G = Games played; AB = At bats; H = Hits; Avg. = Batting average; HR = Home runs; RBI = Runs batted in

Other batters 
Note: G = Games played; AB = At bats; H = Hits; Avg. = Batting average; HR = Home runs; RBI = Runs batted in

Pitching

Starting pitchers 
Note: G = Games pitched; IP = Innings pitched; W = Wins; L = Losses; ERA = Earned run average; SO = Strikeouts

References 
1897 Chicago Colts season at Baseball Reference

Chicago Cubs seasons
Chicago Colts season
Chicago Cubs